John Sharpless is a historian at the University of Wisconsin-Madison and a former political candidate.

Biography
Sharpless was born in Milwaukee, Wisconsin in 1945. He went on to live in Minneapolis, Minnesota and Wayzata, Minnesota. Sharpless is a graduate of the University of Minnesota and the University of Michigan.

Academic career
Sharpless began teaching at the University of Wisconsin-Madison in 1975. His specialties include social and economic history. From 1985 to 1986, Sharpless taught at the University of Papua New Guinea as part of the Fulbright Program. He is Professor Emeritus at Wisconsin-Madison.

Political career
Sharpless was a candidate for the United States House of Representatives from Wisconsin's 2nd congressional district in 2000. He lost to incumbent Tammy Baldwin. Previously, he had been a candidate for the Republican nomination for the seat in 1998, losing to Josephine Musser.

References

Politicians from Milwaukee
Politicians from Minneapolis
People from Wayzata, Minnesota
University of Wisconsin–Madison faculty
Academic staff of the University of Papua New Guinea
Wisconsin Republicans
Candidates in the 2000 United States elections
20th-century American politicians
Candidates in the 1998 United States elections
University of Minnesota alumni
University of Michigan alumni
1945 births
Living people